The Felt Tip EP is an EP by Love Is All, released by Smashing Time in 2005. It was limited to 500 copies.

Track listing

Side one
 "Felt Tip"

Side two
 "Talk Talk Talk Talk"
 "Busy Doing Nothing"

Love Is All albums
2005 EPs